The Cathedral of the Holy Redeemer is a Roman Catholic cathedral located in the city of Qacha's Nek, Lesotho. It is the seat of the Roman Catholic Diocese of Qacha's Nek.

See also
Roman Catholicism in Lesotho

References

Roman Catholic Cathedrals in Lesotho
Buildings and structures in Lesotho